Katherine C. Hughes (born April 6, 1998 in New York City) is an American actress and singer. She has guest starred in NBC's Law & Order: SVU, CBS's Blue Bloods, Men, Women & Children, had a supporting role in the film Me and Earl and the Dying Girl. and main roles in the series My Dead Ex and Perfect Commando.

Career
Hughes competed in Radio Disney's Next Big Thing, season 5 for a chance to record her own single and a guest starring role on Austin & Ally to perform her song. Although she did not make it to the finals, she made it to third place. She has since moved to Los Angeles to continue to pursue acting.

Filmography

Film

Television

References

External links

Virtual International Authority File

1995 births
Living people
American television actresses
American film actresses
Actresses from New York City
21st-century American actresses